The 2003 Wales Rally GB (formally the 59th Wales Rally GB) was the fourteenth round of the 2003 World Rally Championship. The race was held over four days between 6 November and 9 November 2003, and was based in Cardiff, Great Britain. Subaru's Petter Solberg won the race, his 5th win in the World Rally Championship.

Background

Entry list

Itinerary
All dates and times are GMT (UTC±0).

Results

Overall

World Rally Cars

Classification

Special stages

Championship standings
Bold text indicates 2003 World Champions.

Junior World Rally Championship

Classification

Special stages

Championship standings
Bold text indicates 2003 World Champions.

References

External links 
 Official website of the World Rally Championship

Wales Rally GB
2003 Wales Rally GB
Wales Rally GB
November 2003 sports events in the United Kingdom